Adriana Basarić-Çopur (born 17 February 1982) is a Bosnia and Herzegovina former professional tennis player.

Basarić had a career high singles ranking of 323 in the world and won one title on ITF Women's Circuit, which came in her hometown of Mostar in 2001, over Karolina Šprem in the final.

In Fed Cup tennis, Basarić represented Bosnia and Herzegovina in a total of six ties, debuting as a 17-year old in 1999. After appearing in four ties in 1999 she didn't return to the team until 2003, when he played in a further two ties. She won a total of three singles and four doubles rubbers.

ITF finals

Singles: 4 (1–3)

References

External links
 
 
 

1982 births
Living people
Bosnia and Herzegovina female tennis players
Sportspeople from Mostar